Spirit Lost is a 1997 film directed by Neema Barnette and starring James Avery and Yvonne Brisendine.

Premise

After John, a painter, and his wife move into an old house on an island, a seductive widow ghost shows up in mirrors, windows and in John's dreams and nightmares. She eventually lures him into moving into his attic studio while she tries to scare his now unhappy and pregnant wife away.

Cast
Leon Robinson as John
Regina Taylor as Willy
James Avery as Dr. Glidden
Yvonne Brisendine as Dr. Fisher
Deacon Dawson as Realtor
J. Michael Hunter as Harrison Adders
Juanita Jennings as Vera
Leon Robinson as John
Alan Sader as Randolph Smythe

References

External links

1997 films
1997 drama films
Films directed by Neema Barnette
1990s English-language films
American horror drama films
1990s American films